Eric Nzeocha (born April 1, 1993) is a former German-born American football linebacker. He was signed as an undrafted free agent by the Tampa Bay Buccaneers in 2017. He played college football at Wyoming.

Early years
Nzeocha attended high school at FOS Ansbach. He began playing flag football for the Franken Knights youth team, before moving up to the Junior National Team of the Bavarian Football Association. He contributed to the German Junior National Team placing fourth in the U19 European Championship in Spain.

College career
His international exposure earned him a scholarship to play for the University of Wyoming. As a redshirt freshman, he appeared in 11 games, playing on special teams. He was named to the Academic All-Conference team.

As a sophomore, he was a backup tight end in all 12 games, registering 8 receptions for 65 yards. He was named to the Academic All-Conference team for the second time.

As a junior, he was converted into a linebacker. He appeared in 11 games with 5 starts at middle linebacker. He posted 35 tackles (20 solo), one tackle for loss, one pass breakup and one forced fumble. He made eight tackles against the University of North Dakota and the United States Air Force Academy. He was named to the Academic All-Conference team for the third time in his career. As a senior, he was a backup at middle linebacker.

Professional career
Nzeocha was signed as an undrafted free agent by the Tampa Bay Buccaneers after the 2017 NFL Draft on May 25. He participated in the NFL's International Player Pathway program, and was the second German player to spend a season on Tampa Bay's practice squad. He was waived on September 2. On September 3, Nzeocha earned a spot on the 11-man practice squad as an international player. He signed a reserve/future contract with the Buccaneers on January 1, 2018.

On September 1, 2018, Nzeocha was waived by the Buccaneers and was re-signed to the practice squad the next day. He was released on January 7, 2019.

Personal life
His brother Mark Nzeocha plays linebacker for the San Francisco 49ers. Nzeocha is half Nigerian.

References

External links
Wyoming Cowboys bio

1993 births
Living people
German players of American football
People from Ansbach
Sportspeople from Middle Franconia
German sportspeople of Nigerian descent
American football linebackers
Wyoming Cowboys football players
Tampa Bay Buccaneers players
German expatriates in the United States
International Player Pathway Program participants
German expatriate sportspeople in the United States
Expatriate players of American football